The Sheepeater Cliffs are a series of exposed cliffs made up of columnar basalt in Yellowstone National Park in the United States.   The lava was deposited about 500,000 years ago during one of the periodic basaltic floods in Yellowstone Caldera, and later exposed by the Gardner River.  The cliffs are noted as a textbook example of a basaltic flow with well defined joints and hexagonal columns.  They were named after a band of Eastern Shoshone known as Tukuaduka (sheep eaters). Many of the exposed cliffs are located along a steep inaccessible canyon cut by the Gardner near Bunsen Peak, but some of the cliffs located just off the Grand Loop Road can be reached by car.

External links
 National Park Service Video - Sheepeater Cliffs

Geology of Wyoming
Volcanology
Columnar basalts
Landforms of Yellowstone National Park